Refin–Mobilvetta (UCI code: REF), previously known as Brescialat-Ceramiche Refin and Refin-Cantina Tollo, was an Italian-based road bicycle racing team active from 1995 to 1997.
From 1995 to 1997 the main sponsor was Ceramiche Refin, a ceramics company headquartered in Salvaterra (Casalgrande).

History

Refin–Cantina Tollo
The team began life in 1995 under the name of Refin–Cantina Tollo, set up by the manager Primo Franchini, who left the Brescialat–Ceramiche Refin team to found a new team, taking with him four cyclists from Brescialat (Felice Puttini, Fabio Roscioli, Roberto Pelliconi and Heinz Imboden).
In its first year, the team took part in the Giro d'Italia, where Heinz Imboden came 8th in the overall ranking.

Refin–Mobilvetta
In 1996, Refin–Mobilvetta signed up Djamolidine Abdoujaparov in the hope of winning a significant number of races thanks to his skills as a sprint cyclist, together with the talents of Andreas Kappes, already on the team.
After a good year in 1996, the team registered for the Tour de France, during which it won the 15th stage thanks to Abdoujaparov.
In 1997, new members Stefano Colagè and Marco Lietti completed a very young team, which took part for the last time in the Giro d'Italia and the Vuelta a España.
At the end of the year, the Refin sponsor pulled out, and founded ; it could not be seen as a continuation of the preceding team, because it had other team leaders, another bicycle and the only cyclist Luigi Della Bianca .

Notable riders
 Johan Capiot
 Jo Planckaert
 Heinz Imboden
 Felice Puttini
 Andreas Kappes
 Tobias Steinhauser
 Djamolidine Abdoujaparov
 Serguei Uslamine 
 Asiat Saitov
 Flavio Giupponi
 Rodolfo Massi
 Leonardo Piepoli
 Stefano Colagè
 Luca Mazzanti
 Fabio Roscioli
 Marco Lietti
 Mauro Bettin

External links
 Official site of Ceramiche Refin

Defunct cycling teams based in Italy
Cycling teams based in Italy
Cycling teams established in 1995
Cycling teams disestablished in 1997
1995 establishments in Italy
1997 disestablishments in Italy